Perobas Biological Reserve is a biological reserve in the state of Paraná, Brazil.

History

It is located in the municipalities of Tuneiras do Oeste and Cianorte of Paraná.
It is managed by the Chico Mendes Institute for Biodiversity Conservation.

Status

As of 2009 the Biological Reserve was a "strict nature reserve" under IUCN protected area category Ia.
Ecologically it is a contact area between semi-deciduous forest and mixed rain forest, with many peroba trees, an endangered species.
An isolated fragment of forest, it is the only wildlife refuge in the region with great diversity of species.
It is located in the basin of the Ivaí River, which is extremely degraded, with fragile and vulnerable soil.

References

Sources

2006 establishments in Brazil
Biological reserves of Brazil
Protected areas of Paraná (state)
Protected areas established in 2006
Protected areas of the Atlantic Forest